The Burji or Circassian Mamluk dynasty of Circassian origin,  ruled Egypt from 1382 until 1517, during the Mamluk Sultanate. The Circassian community in Cairo especially flourished during this time. Political power-plays often became important in designating a new sultan. During this time Mamluks fought Timur and conquered Cyprus. Constant bickering may have contributed to the ability of the Ottomans to challenge them. Their name means 'of the tower', referring to them ruling from the Citadel east of Cairo.

History

From 1250, Egypt had been ruled by the first Mamluk dynasty, the mostly Cuman-Kipchak Turkic Bahri dynasty. In 1377 a revolt broke out in Syria which spread to Egypt, and the government was taken over by the Circassians Barakah and Barquq; Barquq was proclaimed sultan in 1382, ending the Bahri dynasty. He was expelled in 1389 but recaptured Cairo in 1390. Early on, the Zahiri Revolt threatened to overthrow Barquq though the conspiracy was discovered before agitators could mobilize. Permanently in power, he founded the Burji dynasty.

Faced with a common enemy, Timur, Barquq joined with Bayezid I and Toktamish in a combined resistance and executed Timur's peace envoys. In the following months Timur was engaged in Georgia and unable to respond to Barquq's actions, while Barquq had died by 1399. In 1401, Timur invaded Syria and sacked Aleppo and Damascus. Syria was regained by Barquq's son, sultan Nasir-ad-Din Faraj, after Timur died in 1405, but Faraj continually faced rebellions from the emirs there and he was forced to abdicate in 1412.

In 1421 Egypt was attacked by the Kingdom of Cyprus, and although the Egyptians were unable to capture the island they forced the Cypriotes to acknowledge the suzerainty of the Egyptian sultan Barsbay. During Barsbay's reign Egypt's population was greatly reduced from what it had been a few centuries before, with only 1/5 the number of towns. He frequently raided Asia Minor, but died in 1438.

During the reign of Sayf ad-Din Jaqmaq an attempt to conquer Rhodes in 1444 from the Knights of St. John was repelled.

Sayf ad-Din Inal came to power in 1453 and had friendly relations with the Ottoman sultan Mehmed II, who captured Constantinople later that year, causing great rejoicings in Egypt. However, under the Greek reign of Khoshkadam, who took power in 1463, Egypt began the struggle between the Egyptian and the Ottoman sultanates which finally led to the incorporation of Egypt in the Ottoman Empire. Both Koshkadam and Mehmed II supported different candidates to the principality of Karaman; then in 1467 sultan Kait Bey offended the Ottoman sultan Bayezid II, whose brother was poisoned while being entertained by Kait. Bayezid II seized Adana, Tarsus and other places within Egyptian territory, but was eventually defeated by Kait. Kait also tried to help the Muslims in Spain by threatening the Christians in Syria, but without effect. He died in 1496, leaving several hundred thousand ducats debts to the great Venetian trading families.

List of Burji Sultans

Orange shaded row signifies brief interruption in the rule of Burji dynasty by Bahri dynasty.
Silver shaded row signifies interruption in the rule of Burji dynasty by Abbasid dynasty.

Conquest by Ottomans

The relationship between the Ottomans and the Mamluks had been adversarial since the Fall of Constantinople to the Ottomans in 1453. Both states constantly vied for control of the spice trade, and the Ottomans aspired to eventually taking control of the Holy Cities of Islam. An earlier conflict, which lasted from 1485 to 1491, had led to a stalemate.

By 1516, the Ottomans were free from other concerns—Sultan Selim I had just vanquished the Safavid Persians at the Battle of Chaldiran in 1514—and turned their full might against the Mamluks, who ruled in Syria and Egypt, to complete the Ottoman conquest of the Middle East.

In 1517 the Ottomans and their Sultan Selim I defeated the Mamluks with the capture of Cairo on January 20. The centre of power transferred from Cairo to Constantinople. However, the Ottoman Empire retained the Mamluks as an Egyptian ruling class and the Mamluks and the Burji family succeeded in regaining some of their influence, but remained vassals of the Ottomans and the Ottoman Empire chose the Pashas or governors of the region. Mamluks were entirely destroyed and exterminated by the Mehmet Ali of Egypt during his power struggle in Egypt after he put order there in 1800 with his Albanian troops and after he invaded Sudan.

See also

History of Arab Egypt
History of Ottoman Egypt
List of Sunni Muslim dynasties

References

Further reading
 

|-

|-

 
Mamluk Sultanate
Circassian dynasties
1382 establishments
1517 disestablishments
14th-century establishments in the Mamluk Sultanate
16th-century disestablishments in the Mamluk Sultanate